Netbabyworld is one of the first browser-based social gaming sites, known for its distinctive low-polygon 3d imagery, centered on an ensemble cast of characters. Founded in 1999, Netbabyworld developed as a merge venture with the Swedish company PlayCom (formerly Game Design Sweden).

Games
Netbabyworld created around 20 games from 1999–2003, initially through Macromedia Shockwave, then later moving to their own proprietary PlayCom engine.

Reception
While the site enjoyed a great deal of popularity through this period, winning the 2002 Webby for best game site, Netbaby's monetization model was unclear.

The Playcom website states that "In April 2003 PlayCom was acquired through a management buyout by the management team, as well as key employees from former Netbaby World." It was around this time that the community features were removed, and site updates ceased.

Legacy and influence
As of 2009, Netbabyworld.com is still online and serving the Shockwave-based games. A former member of the team, Nick Sakellariou, has released a mobile version of Ninja Girl.

External links
 
 Playcom official site

References

Video game companies established in 1999
Video game development companies
Browser-based game websites
Video game companies of Sweden
Webby Award winners
1999 establishments in Sweden